Klaus Bachler (born 27 July 1991, in Unzmarkt) is an Austrian racing driver. He has competed in the FIA World Endurance Championship and ADAC GT Masters with Porsche. He won the 2007 Formula Lista Junior championship season.

Racing record

Complete Porsche Supercup results
(key) (Races in bold indicate pole position) (Races in italics indicate fastest lap)

‡ Bachler was a guest driver, therefore he was ineligible for points.
† Driver  did not finish the race, but was classified as he completed over 90% of the race distance.

Complete FIA World Endurance Championship results

24 Hours of Le Mans results

Complete WeatherTech SportsCar Championship results
(key) (Races in bold indicate pole position; results in italics indicate fastest lap)

External links
 
 
 

1991 births
Living people
People from Murtal District
Austrian racing drivers
ADAC Formel Masters drivers
Formula Lista Junior drivers
German Formula Three Championship drivers
FIA Institute Young Driver Excellence Academy drivers
Porsche Supercup drivers
24 Hours of Daytona drivers
24 Hours of Le Mans drivers
Rolex Sports Car Series drivers
European Le Mans Series drivers
WeatherTech SportsCar Championship drivers
FIA World Endurance Championship drivers
ADAC GT Masters drivers
Sportspeople from Styria
24H Series drivers

Porsche Motorsports drivers
Neuhauser Racing drivers
Walter Lechner Racing drivers
Rowe Racing drivers
International GT Open drivers
Nürburgring 24 Hours drivers
Le Mans Cup drivers
Porsche Carrera Cup Germany drivers